The 2018–19 BBL-Pokal was the 52nd season of the German Basketball Cup, the domestic cup competition of the Basketball Bundesliga (BBL). This was the first season with the new format, which changed to a sixteen team knock-out tournament, with the sixteen highest seeded teams from the previous season qualifying.

Brose Bamberg won their fifth title after a one-point win over Alba Berlin in the final. Nikos Zisis hit the game-winner with 2.4 seconds left to give Bamberg the win by a one-point margin.

Participants
The sixteen highest placed teams from the 2017–18 Basketball Bundesliga, without the relegated teams and promoted teams, qualified for the tournament.

Round and draw dates

Round of 16
The draw was held on 27 July 2018.

Quarterfinals
The draw was held on 12 October 2018.

Semifinals
The draw was held on 23 December 2018.

Final
The draw for home-court advantage was held on 20 January 2019.

See also
2018–19 Basketball Bundesliga

References

External links
Official website 

BBL-Pokal seasons
BBL-Pokal